The 1980–81 Duke Blue Devils men's basketball team represented Duke University. The Blue Devils were coached by Mike Krzyzewski in his first year with the team. The club ranked fifth in the ACC. The team played its home games in the Cameron Indoor Stadium in Durham, North Carolina, and was a member of the Atlantic Coast Conference.

Roster

Schedule

Team players drafted into the NBA

References

Duke
Duke Blue Devils men's basketball seasons
Duke
1980 in sports in North Carolina
1981 in sports in North Carolina